Passages is the sixth studio album by guitarist Frank Gambale, released in 1994 by Victor Entertainment and reissued on 24 April 2001 by Samson Records.

Track listing

Personnel

Frank Gambale – vocals, guitar, mixing, production
Otmaro Ruíz – synthesizer, Hammond organ
Walfredo Reyes, Jr. – drums, percussion
Alphonso Johnson – bass
Brandon Fields – saxophone
Robert M. Biles – engineering, mixing
Matt Stephens – engineering assistance
Tim Mariner – engineering assistance
Alan Yoshida – mastering
Akira Taguchi – executive production

References

External links
In Review: Frank Gambale "Passages" at Guitar Nine Records

Frank Gambale albums
1994 albums
Victor Entertainment albums